Project 10412 class patrol boats are an export version of the Russian Svetlyak class patrol boat. These vessels are designed to carry out a variety of missions, from patrol missions to prevent violations of maritime state border, to protect friendly vessels and facilities from enemy surface and air attacks, to monitor exclusive economic zones, to protect natural resources areas and coastal lines of communications, etc.

Armament & Equipment
2x AK-306 gun mount (AK-176 gun can be mounted in the bow section)
2x 14.5mm machine gun
16x Igla-type MANPADS
FR-2150W navigational radar
Gorizont-25 integrated navigation system
GAGK1 Pastilshchik-D gyroazimuth/horizon compass
KM-69M1 magnetic compass
LEMM-2-2 electromagnetic log with echosounder functions
AP-5 dead-reckoning tracer
RN-1 radio range-finder
KPI-9F receiver-indicator of ground-based radio-navigation systems
NT-200D shipborne satellite navigation equipment
Buran-6E automated communications system

Versions

The Slovenian version, Triglav has only one AK-630, place for two inflatable boats, one decompression chamber for divers, two 14.5mm machine guns, sixteen Igla-type MANPADS, 9M120 anti-ship missile system, PK-10 anti-missile projectiles and three MTU diesel engines type 4000 with 2.880 kW each.

Operators

Vietnam People's Navy (6)

Slovenian Navy (1) – one Russian vessel delivered as payment for debt, named Triglav.

References

Patrol vessels of Russia
Patrol boat classes